Surov is a Russian masculine surname, its feminine counterpart is Surova. Notable people with the surname include:

Igor Surov (born 1985), Russian footballer
Nikolay Surov (1947–2010), Russian rower 

Russian-language surnames